Gashnadar (also Romanized as Gashnādar) is a village in Nesa Rural District, Asara District, Karaj County, Alborz Province, Iran. At the 2006 census, its population was 94, in 33 families.

References 

Populated places in Karaj County